Unforeseen Shadows is the first solo studio album by American rapper Illogic. It was released in 2000.

Critical reception
Dan Gizzi of AllMusic gave the album 4 stars out of 5, calling it "an impressive debut album." He said, "Illogic is impressive on the mic; he has a creative flow and good lyrics."

In 2015, Fact placed it at number 93 on the "100 Best Indie Hip-Hop Records of All Time" list.

Track listing

References

External links
 
 Unforeseen Shadows at Bandcamp

2000 debut albums
Illogic albums